Ángel García (born 8 December 1941) is a Puerto Rican basketball player. He competed in the men's tournament at the 1964 Summer Olympics.

References

1941 births
Living people
Puerto Rican men's basketball players
Olympic basketball players of Puerto Rico
Basketball players at the 1964 Summer Olympics
Place of birth missing (living people)
20th-century Puerto Rican people